Nora-Jane Noone (born 8 March 1984) is an Irish actress. In 2020, The Irish Times ranked her 47th on its list of the greatest Irish film actors of all time.

She made her screen debut in the drama film The Magdalene Sisters (2002) and had her breakthrough role in the horror film The Descent (2005), which earned Noone her first IFTA Film & Drama Award nomination. She received additional IFTA Award nominations for her roles in Savage (2009) and Wildfire (2020).

Early life and education
Noone grew up in Upper Newcastle, Galway City. She trained for two years at the Performing Arts School in Galway, and is a proficient musician (piano to Grade 7 level) and dancer. Her previous acting role before The Magdalene Sisters was as Jan in a secondary school production of Grease.

She graduated in 2004 from NUI Galway with a degree in Science, and then moved to London. She met her husband Chris Marquette on the set of the film 'I Hate the Man in My Basement' and they have a daughter who was born in January 2020.

Career
Noone made her professional film debut playing Bernadette in Peter Mullan's film The Magdalene Sisters. The film won the Best Film prize in the 2002 Venice Film Festival, and was nominated as Best British Picture at the British Academy Film Awards. Noone also won Best Actress in an Ensemble Role at the British Independent Film Awards and was nominated for best newcomer that year. She has also been nominated for best supporting actress in 2005 and 2010 at the Irish Film and Television Awards.

Noone also co-starred in The Descent and Doomsday, both directed by Neil Marshall, Speed Dating and Ella Enchanted. Other work includes the short films News for the Church written and directed by Andrew McCarthy and The Listener directed by Michael Chang. Noone also recorded Walking at Ringsend for BBC Radio 4. In 2008, Noone appeared in Beyond the Rave and Insatiable.

Noone has also appeared in The Descent Part 2, The Day of the Triffids and The Runaway and she has co-starred in episodes 1–6 in season one of Jack Taylor. In 2013 she also began writing a film short.

Filmography

Film

Television

Awards and nominations

References

External links

Living people
1984 births
21st-century Irish actresses
Actresses from Galway (city)
Alumni of the University of Galway
Irish film actresses
Irish television actresses